Luke Ablett (born 22 November 1982) is a former Australian rules footballer with the Sydney Swans of the AFL. He is the son of former Hawthorn player Kevin Ablett, who was less well known than his older brother and fellow Hawthorn player Geoff Ablett and younger brother, the legendary Geelong player Gary Ablett. He is also the cousin of former Geelong Cats and Gold Coast Suns player Gary Ablett Jr.

Having played for local club Drouin and the Gippsland Under 18s side, Ablett was drafted by Sydney in the second round of the 2000 National Draft and made his debut in Round 13 of the 2002 season against Fremantle. After playing four games in both that season and the next, including two matches in the 2003 finals series, he secured a regular place in the team in 2004, and made a role for himself on his own merits as a midfielder and run-with player. In 2005 he missed only one game and steadily improved, his average possessions nearly doubling the previous year's figures. Ablett was a member of the Swans' 2005 grand final winning team, despite kicking straight to West Coast player Ben Cousins at a crucial moment, threatening to lose the game for Sydney. Being part of the premiership team had him following in the footsteps of his uncle Geoff, a two time premiership player for Hawthorn in the 1970s. Ablett now plays for the Fitzroy Football Club in Melbourne.

Ablett was delisted by Sydney on 13 November 2009.

Statistics

|- style="background-color: #EAEAEA"
! scope="row" style="text-align:center" | 2002
|style="text-align:center;"|
| 20 || 4 || 0 || 0 || 12 || 7 || 19 || 3 || 3 || 0.0 || 0.0 || 3.0 || 1.8 || 4.8 || 0.8 || 0.8
|-
! scope="row" style="text-align:center" | 2003
|style="text-align:center;"|
| 20 || 4 || 1 || 0 || 10 || 7 || 17 || 6 || 0 || 0.3 || 0.0 || 2.5 || 1.8 || 4.3 || 1.5 || 0.0
|- style="background:#eaeaea;"
! scope="row" style="text-align:center" | 2004
|style="text-align:center;"|
| 20 || 21 || 2 || 4 || 123 || 76 || 199 || 42 || 31 || 0.1 || 0.2 || 5.9 || 3.6 || 9.5 || 2.0 || 1.5
|-
! scope="row" style="text-align:center" | 2005
|style="text-align:center;"|
| 20 || 25 || 9 || 12 || 243 || 115 || 358 || 65 || 64 || 0.4 || 0.5 || 9.7 || 4.6 || 14.3 || 2.6 || 2.6
|- style="background:#eaeaea;"
! scope="row" style="text-align:center" | 2006
|style="text-align:center;"|
| 20 || 24 || 8 || 8 || 244 || 108 || 352 || 68 || 72 || 0.3 || 0.3 || 10.2 || 4.5 || 14.7 || 2.8 || 3.0
|-
! scope="row" style="text-align:center" | 2007
|style="text-align:center;"|
| 20 || 20 || 8 || 10 || 196 || 109 || 305 || 60 || 62 || 0.4 || 0.5 || 9.8 || 5.5 || 15.3 || 3.0 || 3.1
|- style="background:#eaeaea;"
! scope="row" style="text-align:center" | 2008
|style="text-align:center;"|
| 20 || 22 || 3 || 7 || 190 || 117 || 307 || 53 || 56 || 0.1 || 0.3 || 8.6 || 5.3 || 14.0 || 2.4 || 2.5
|-
! scope="row" style="text-align:center" | 2009
|style="text-align:center;"|
| 20 || 13 || 8 || 10 || 76 || 90 || 166 || 35 || 40 || 0.6 || 0.8 || 5.8 || 6.9 || 12.8 || 2.7 || 3.1
|- class="sortbottom"
! colspan=3| Career
! 133
! 39
! 51
! 1094
! 629
! 1723
! 332
! 328
! 0.3
! 0.4
! 8.2
! 4.7
! 13.0
! 2.5
! 2.5
|}

References

External links 

Sydney Swans site player profile

Luke's Tumblr page

1982 births
Luke
Australian rules footballers from Victoria (Australia)
Living people
Sydney Swans players
Sydney Swans Premiership players
Gippsland Power players
One-time VFL/AFL Premiership players